Stachyocnemus is a genus of broad-headed bugs in the family Alydidae. There is one described species in Stachyocnemus, S. apicalis.

References

Further reading

 
 

Articles created by Qbugbot
Alydinae
Pentatomomorpha genera